Ardeshir (also Romanized as Ardeshīr; also known as Ardashil’ and Ardashīr) is a village in Ozomdel-e Shomali Rural District, in the Central District of Varzaqan County, East Azerbaijan Province, Iran. At the 2006 census, its population was 68, in 17 families.

References 

Towns and villages in Varzaqan County